The Jordaanoproer, The Jordan riot, was a riot of mainly unemployed people in Amsterdam in July 1934. The riots were a protest against the economic conditions in the Netherlands in the aftermath of the Great Depression. According to the November 1934 report of Chief Commissioner Versteeg, five people were killed and 56 seriously injured, including eight police officers and one member of the military police. During disturbances in the same period in Rotterdam, one person was killed on 10 July.

References

Riots and civil disorder in the Netherlands
1934 in the Netherlands
1934 protests